Chang Yani (born 7 December 2001) is a Chinese diver.

Chang won all four legs of the 2016 FINA Diving World Series in the 10 metre mixed platform synchronized event together with Tai Xiaohu. In the 2017 FINA Diving World Series Chang won two gold medals in the women's synchronized 10 metre platform event together with Ren Qian.  

Together with Shi Tingmao she won two gold medals in the women's synchronized 3 metre springboard event. The pair became world champions at the 2017 World Aquatics Championships in Budapest. They won gold at the 2018 FINA Diving World Cup and the 2018 Asian Games as well. 

At the 2019 World Aquatics Championships Chang participated in the 1 metre springboard final, where she reached rank six. In the same discipline Chang won silver at the 2019 Military World Games.

References

2001 births
Living people
Chinese female divers
Asian Games medalists in diving
Asian Games gold medalists for China
Divers at the 2018 Asian Games
World Aquatics Championships medalists in diving
Medalists at the 2018 Asian Games
Sportspeople from Hubei
People from Xiantao
21st-century Chinese women